Carnival in Babylon is an LP by German rock band Amon Düül II which was released in 1972. It is their fourth studio album. It was recorded at the Bavaria Studio (with Peter Kramper as the engineer) and remixed at Studio 70 (with Jürgen Koppers as the engineer). It was produced by Olaf Kübler and the band themselves. The original cover design and photos were by F.U. Rogner.

All lyrics written in English, except on C.I.D. in Uruk written in German.

Track listing

Bonus tracks on 2002 Repertoire CD reissue (REP 4966):

Bonus tracks on 2007 Revisited CD reissue (SPV 305352 CD):

Personnel

Amon Düül II
 John Weinzierl – electric guitar, acoustic 12-string guitar, vocal
 Chris Karrer – electric guitar, acoustic guitar, violin, soprano sax, vocal
 Lothar Meid – bass, vocal
 Renate Knaup-Krötenschwanz – vocal
 Danny Fichelscher – drums, congas
 Peter Leopold – drums, tambourine
 Karl-Heinz Hausmann – keyboards, electronics

Guests
 Joy Alaska – backing vocals
 Falk Ulrich Rogner – organ *
 Olaf Kübler – soprano sax, door

(*) Falk Rogner was previously a band member, but listed as a guest for this album; he returned as a full member on the next album.

References

1972 albums
Amon Düül II albums
United Artists Records albums